The Elva is river in Estonia in Põlva, Tartu and Valga County. The river is 82.4 km long and basin size is 451.4 km2. It runs from Valgjärv into Emajõgi.

There live also trouts and Thymallus thymallus.

See also
List of rivers of Estonia

References

Rivers of Estonia
Põlva County
Tartu County
Valga County